The Uzbekistan Women's League, also the Uzbek women's national football championship, is top division of women's football in Uzbekistan. The league is organized by the Uzbekistan Football Federation. Before 1991, some Uzbek women's clubs had competed in the Soviet Union women's league system, but after the collapse of the Soviet Union most women's teams left for Russia or simply dissolved.

Teams 
The 2022 season was played by the following 10 teams:

Metallurg Bekobod
Neftchi Farg'ona
Sogdiyona Jizzak
Navbahor Namangan
FK OKMK Olmaliq (Olmaliq Kon-metallurgiya Kombinati)
PFC Sevinch Qarshi
Bunyodkor Toshkent
Lokomotiv Toshkent
Paxtakor Toshkent
Qizilqum Zarafshon

Format
The league features 10 teams that play a double round-robin to decide the champion. The season is held on several matchweeks, within one matchweek which lasts five days each team plays one game per day in the matchweek's city.

Champions
The champions so far are:
1995: Chehra Toshkent
1996: Baho Toshkent
1997: Andijanka Andijon
1998: Dilnoza Toshkent
1999: Andijanka Andijon
2000: Andijanka Andijon
2001: Gulbahor Namangan
2002: Andijanka Andijon
2003: Andijanka Andijon
2004: Sevinch Qarshi (Севинч)
2005: Andijanka Andijon
2006: Sevinch Qarshi
2007: Sevinch Qarshi
2008: Sevinch Qarshi
2009: Sevinch Qarshi 
2010: Sevinch Qarshi
2011: Sevinch Qarshi
2012: Sevinch Qarshi
2013: Sevinch Qarshi
2014: Sevinch Qarshi
2015: Sevinch Qarshi
2016: Sevinch Qarshi
2017: Metallurg Bekobod
2018: Bunyodkor Tashkent
2019: Sevinch Qarshi
2020: Bunyodkor Tashkent
2021: Sogdiyona Jizzak
2022: Sevinch Qarshi

See also
 AFC Women's Club Championship

References

External links
 Official website of the UFF (in Uzbek)
 2017 standings at Sevinch website

1
Uzbekistan
women
Sports leagues established in 1995
1995 establishments in Uzbekistan
Women's sports leagues in Uzbekistan